Trumpet tree or trumpet bush may refer to:

 Several species of Cecropia, including:
 Cecropia obtusifolia
 Cecropia peltata
Dolichandrone spathacea, mangrove trumpet tree
 The genus Handroanthus
 The genus Tabebuia, including:
Tabebuia aurea - "Caribbean trumpet tree" or silver trumpet tree, native to the South American mainland
Tabebuia heterophylla - pink trumpet tree, native to Caribbean islands
Tabebuia rosea - rosy trumpet tree

See also
 Angel's trumpet, several plants
 Trumpetflower, several plants
 Campsis, trumpet vine or trumpet creeper